Crassula alstonii is a species of succulent in the genus Crassula found in Cape Provinces, South Africa.The species is in USDA hardiness zone 10a-11.

Growing
Like some other plants of the genus, Crassula alstonii is easy to grow and needs below average to average water.  They need light shade and need 6.1-7.8pH soil.  They can be easily propagated from a single leaf, along with offsets.

References

Flora of South Africa
alstonii